FL Studio (previously known as FruityLoops before 2003) is a digital audio workstation (DAW) developed by the Belgian company Image-Line.

FL Studio features a graphical user interface with a pattern-based music sequencer. The program is available in four different editions for Microsoft Windows and macOS.

Image-Line offers lifetime free updates to the program after one-time purchases, which means customers receive all future updates of the software for free after their purchase. Image-Line also develops FL Studio Mobile for Android, iOS, macOS and Universal Windows Platform devices.

FL Studio can also be used as either a virtual studio technology (VST) or Audio Unit (AU) instrument in other audio workstation programs and also functions as a ReWire client. Image-Line also offers its own VST and AU instruments and audio applications. FL Studio has been used by numerous highly visible hip hop and EDM producers, including Metro Boomin, Porter Robinson, Alan Walker, Madeon, Soulja Boy, Southside, Martin Garrix, Avicii, Imanbek, Lex Luger and Deadmau5.

History
The first version of Fruity Loops (1.0.0) was developed by Didier Dambrin and was partially released on December 18, 1997. Its official launch was in early 1998, when it was still a four-channel MIDI drum machine. Dambrin became Chief Software Architect for the program, and it quickly underwent a series of large upgrades that made it into a popular and complex digital audio workstation.

FruityLoops was renamed to "FL Studio" in mid 2003, after the threat of a lawsuit from Kellogg's and to improve the software's marketability. Software piracy was a major issue in the company's early days, and it took nearly 5 years for the company to earn money from users purchasing legitimate licenses.

On May 22, 2018, a macOS-compatible version of FL Studio was released.

Overview

Editions 
FL Studio comes in several editions with different levels of functionality. The free trial version includes all of the program's features, all plugins, and allows users to render project audio to WAV, MIDI, MP3, and OGG. Projects saved while in demo mode, however, can only be opened once FL Studio and its plugins have been registered. Also, instrument presets cannot be saved and the audio output of some instruments will cut out momentarily every few minutes until the program and its plugins have been registered.

Fruity Edition 
The Fruity Edition allows users to access the playlist, piano roll, and event automation features, which allow for complex and lengthy arranging and sequencing. There is also VST/ReWire support so that FL Studio can be an instrument in other hosts such as Cubase, Sonic Solutions, and Logic. As of version 20.8.3, this edition includes 82 instruments and effects; it does not support audio recording and the use of audio clips.

Producer Edition 
The Producer Edition includes all of the features of the Fruity Edition, as well as full audio recording for internal and external audio and post-production tools. It allows for hand-drawing point and curve based splines (referred to as "automation clips"). Plugins include Edison, Slicex (loop slicer and re-arranger), Sytrus, Maximus, Vocodex and Synthmaker. It also allows for waveform viewing of audio clips and the ability to add cue points.

Signature Bundle 
This edition includes the Producer Edition as well as a series of plugins such as the Fruity Video Player, DirectWave Sampler, Harmless, NewTone, Pitcher, Gross Beat and the Hardcore Guitar Effects Suite.

All Plugins Edition 
The All Plugins Edition includes the Signature Bundle along with extra plugins, particularly synthesizers.

Mobile 
On June 21, 2011, Image-Line released FL Studio Mobile for iOS and in April 2013 for Android. Both support the ability to create multi-track projects on mobile devices including iPod Touches, iPhones, iPads, Android 2.3.3 and higher smartphones and tablets.

Groove 
On September 2, 2013, a new standalone app for Windows 8 was released. It is a Groovebox-style application optimised for touch-based music creation.

System requirements
FL Studio 20 works on Windows 7/8/10 (32-bit or 64-bit versions) or on macOS 10.13. FL Studio requires a 2 GHz AMD or Intel Pentium 3 CPU with full SSE1 support. It requires 2 GB of free disk space and 4 GB of RAM is recommended. The website states that "the more powerful your CPU, the more instruments and FX you can run."

FL Studio processes audio using an internal 32-bit floating point engine. It supports sampling rates up to 192 kHz using either WDM- or ASIO-enabled drivers.

Program features
Version 9.0 introduced support for multi-core effects processing and improved support for multi-core instrument processing.
Version 10.0, released on March 29, 2011, included a new project browser, fixed some bugs, and smoothed envelope points. It also introduced Patcher, a modular workflow environment capable of chaining together an unlimited number of instruments and effects.
Version 11.0, released on April 19, 2013, included multi-touch support, improved tempo automation, new plugins such as BassDrum, GMS, Effector, Patcher, and new piano roll features (VFX Key Mapper, VFX Color Mapper).
Version 12.0, released on April 22, 2015, added a new vectorial UI, updated plugins, multi-touch support, a redesigned mixer, improved 32 and 64 bit plugin support and improved file management.
Version 20.0, released on May 22, 2018, skipped versions 13 to 19 to celebrate the 20th anniversary of the program. It introduced native macOS support, multiple time-signatures, MIDI conversion to audio, unlimited playlist arrangements, improved plugin delay compensation, the return of the step sequencer graph editor, In-situ rendering ("freezing"), and other improvements.

The mixer interface allows for any number of channel configurations. This allows mixing in 2.1, 5.1, or 7.1 surround sound, as long as the output hardware interface has an equivalent number of outputs. The mixer also supports audio-in, enabling FL Studio to record multitrack audio.

FL Studio supports audio time stretching and pitch scaling, beat slicing, chopping, and editing of audio, and as of version 12.9 it can record up to 125 simultaneous audio tracks. Other key features include a digital piano roll. Audio can be imported or exported as WAV, MP3, OGG, FLAC, MIDI, ZIP, or the native project format with an .FLP filename extension.

The trial allows users to save projects, but does not allow re-opening them. Tracks may be exported to any of the available file formats.

Plug-ins
FL Studio comes with a variety of plugins and generators (software synthesizers) written in the program's own native plugin architecture. FL Studio also has support for third-party VST and DirectX plugins. The API has a built in wrapper for full VST, VST2, VST3, DX, and ReWire compatibility.

Although FL Studio's own plugins are set to be available only in their native format in the future, some of them also function independently as standalone programs and can be purchased in VST format for use with other DAWs.

Virtual effects
FL Studio is bundled with a variety of sound processing effects, including common audio effects such as chorus, compression, distortion, delay, flanger, phaser, reverb, gate, equalization, vocoding, maximization, and limiting.

Synthesizers

FL Studio's install contains the entirety of native software synthesizers, internally labeled as "generators". Depending on the edition of the program, some will be locked in trial mode until the synth itself or a software upgrade is purchased.

Harmor 
Harmor is Image-Line's flagship synthesizer. Initially released in late 2011 as a successor to Harmless, it was envisioned as a way to work with additive synthesis through an interface typical of subtractive synthesizers. It also includes many functions previously found within individual FL Studio utilities. such as the ability to produce sounds from pictures fed into the synth (known as image resynthesis).

Sytrus 
Sytrus is an FM synthesizer with an internal effects module and additional wavetable capabilities. Its architecture can let it interface directly with patches from Yamaha DX7 units, allowing it to import original SYSEX data.

Dedicated hardware 
As with other DAW developers, Image-Line has collaborated with hardware manufacturers in two different occasions, resulting in the release of products branded and compatible with FL Studio.

The first was the Akai FIRE, a MIDI controller with touch and pressure-sensitive buttons modelled after the software's channel rack pattern editor. Released in 2018, it can be used as a pattern editor, keyboard, drumpad, multi-colour peak visualizer and performance controller. A distinctive feature of the Akai FIRE is that up to 4 units can be connected to a single instance of FL Studio, chained together or with a different mode set for each. It is sold in two variants, one coming without extra software (aimed at existing FL Studio users), and one bundled with an exclusive version of the Fruity edition called the Fruity Fire Edition.

The latter of these involvements is currently the Novation FL Key line of controllers. It consists of two redesigned MIDI Keyboards – dubbed the FL Key Mini and the FL Key 37, the latter being larger in keybed and size – originally from Novation's own Launchkey line, modified to have a grey case and an FL Studio-themed RGB lighting palette.

Despite some initial traction regarding the Akai FIRE's unusual velocity implementation, both units have went on to receive broadly positive reception from the professional press.

Reception
FL Studio has been praised for its simplicity, power, and ease of use. Jamie Lendino of PCMag wrote that "While [FL Studio is] still clearly geared for electronic music production 'in the box,' as opposed to recording live musicians playing acoustic instruments, you can record or create just about any kind of audio project with it." Criticisms include a difficult audio recording system.

Notable users

 808 Mafia
 9th Wonder
 Afrojack
 Alex da Kid
 Alan Walker
 Avicii
 Basshunter
 Benga
 Boi-1da
 Cardo
 Cazzette
The Flashbulb
Hit-Boy
 Hopsin
 Jahlil Beats
Kane Beatz
Kaye Styles
Kouhei Matsunaga
 Lee on the Beats
 Lex Luger
Madeon
 Masterkraft
 Martin Garrix
 Max Tannone
 Mesto
Metro Boomin
Mike Will Made It
 Mustard
Nic Nac
Nick Mira
Pi'erre Bourne
Pogo
Porter Robinson
SAP
 Savant
Seven Lions
Skream
Sonny Digital
Soulja Boy
Southside
TBJZL
TM88
 Toby Fox
 Tom Ellard
 Tyler, the Creator
 Ugly God
 Vinylz
 Young Chop
Yung Carter
Zardonic
Zaytoven
Zircon

See also

 Comparison of digital audio editors

References

External links

 

1997 software
Digital audio workstation software
Electronic music software
Music looping
Music production software
Soundtrack creation software
Windows multimedia software
Pascal (programming language) software
FL Studio